Trexenta is a traditional subregion of Sardinia, Italy, located in the northern part of the province of Cagliari. It encompasses an area of c. 400 km², including 13 municipalities.

Overview
The terrain is mostly hilly  in the eastern part, becoming more plain southwards. Economy is mostly based on agriculture, with the cultivation of cereals, olives and vines.

In the Middle Ages it was part of the Judicate of Cagliari.

See also
Province of South Sardinia

References

Geography of Sardinia
Province of South Sardinia